Michel Paccard (1 November 1908 – 4 July 1987) was a French ice hockey player. He competed in the men's tournament at the 1936 Winter Olympics.

References

1908 births
1987 deaths
Chamonix HC players
Ice hockey players at the 1936 Winter Olympics
Olympic ice hockey players of France
People from Chamonix
Sportspeople from Haute-Savoie